The following highways are numbered 61:

International
 Asian Highway 61
 European route E61

Canada
 Alberta Highway 61
 Newfoundland and Labrador Route 61
 Ontario Highway 61

India
 National Highway 61 (India)
 State Highway 61 (Kerala)
 State Highway 61 (Rajasthan)

Korea, South
National Route 61

New Zealand
 State Highway 61 (New Zealand)

Philippines
 N61 highway (Philippines)

Poland 
  Expressway S61
  National road 61

United Kingdom
 British A61
 British M61

United States
 Interstate 61 (proposed)
 U.S. Route 61
 Alabama State Route 61
 Arizona State Route 61
 California State Route 61
 Colorado State Highway 61
 Connecticut Route 61
 Florida State Road 61
 Florida State Road 61A
 County Road 61 (Wakulla County, Florida)
 Georgia State Route 61
 Hawaii Route 61
 Idaho State Highway 61
 Illinois Route 61
 Indiana State Road 61
 K-61 (Kansas highway)
 Kentucky Route 61
 Louisiana State Route 61 (former)
 Maryland Route 61
 M-61 (Michigan highway)
 Minnesota State Highway 61
 County Road 61 (Hennepin County, Minnesota)
 County Road 61 (Lake County, Minnesota)
 County Road 61 (Pine County, Minnesota)
 County Road 61 (St. Louis County, Minnesota)
Missouri Route 61 (1922) (former)
 Nebraska Highway 61
 Nebraska Link 61D
 Nebraska Spur 61A
 Nevada State Route 61 (former)
 County Route 61 (Bergen County, New Jersey)
 New Mexico State Road 61
 New York State Route 61
 County Route 61 (Chautauqua County, New York)
 County Route 61 (Columbia County, New York)
 County Route 61 (Dutchess County, New York)
 County Route 61 (Greene County, New York)
 County Route 61 (Madison County, New York)
 County Route 61 (Onondaga County, New York)
 County Route 61 (Orange County, New York)
 County Route 61 (Putnam County, New York)
 County Route 61 (Schoharie County, New York)
 County Route 61 (Suffolk County, New York)
 County Route 61 (Sullivan County, New York)
 County Route 61 (Washington County, New York)
 North Carolina Highway 61
 North Dakota Highway 61 (former)
 Ohio State Route 61
Oklahoma:
 Oklahoma State Highway 61 (1934–1941) (former)
 Oklahoma State Highway 61 (1944–1968) (former)
 Oklahoma State Highway 61A (former)
 Pennsylvania Route 61
 South Carolina Highway 61
 South Dakota Highway 61 (former)
 Tennessee State Route 61
 Texas State Highway 61
 Texas State Highway Loop 61 (former)
 Farm to Market Road 61
 Texas Park Road 61
 Utah State Route 61
 Virginia State Route 61
 West Virginia Route 61
 Wisconsin Highway 61 (former)

See also
 A61
 Highway 61 (disambiguation)
 Route 61 (disambiguation)